The standings of the teams playing in TFF 3. Lig Ranking Groups, Classifying Groups and Promotion Group in 2008–09 season are as follows.
According to league regulations, if two or more teams are on equal points after the end of the season, higher number of points obtained in the matches played among the teams in question will be used to separate teams.

Ranking groups

Group 1

Last updated on December 28, 2008

Group 2
Last updated on December 28, 2008

Group 3

Last updated on December 29, 2008

Group 4
Last updated on December 28, 2008

Group 5

Last updated on December 28, 2008

Classifying groups

Group 1

Last updated on May 24, 2009

Group 2

Last updated on May 24, 2009

Group 3

Last updated on May 24, 2009

Group 4

Last updated on May 24, 2009

Group 5

Last updated on May 24, 2009

Promotion group

Last updated on May 24, 2009

Play-offs

Group matches

Finals

References 

 
TFF Third League seasons
4